Oakland Plantation is a historic plantation house located near Fort Motte, Calhoun County, South Carolina. It was built about 1800, and is a -story clapboard house with two flanking wings set back from the façade. The house sits on a brick foundation and has an enclosed basement. It has a front porch, supported by six square columns. Oakland is still surrounded by farmland, and the house and one outbuilding, the original kitchen, are situated on a one-acre lot.

It was listed in the National Register of Historic Places in 1975.

References

Plantation houses in South Carolina
Houses on the National Register of Historic Places in South Carolina
Houses completed in 1800
Houses in Calhoun County, South Carolina
National Register of Historic Places in Calhoun County, South Carolina